UnLtd - The Foundation for Social Entrepreneurs is a charitable organisation in the United Kingdom set up by seven organisations that promote social entrepreneurship.  The organisation offers cash awards, networking and mentorship opportunities for social entrepreneurs in the UK, and has affiliate organizations in a number of other countries.

History 
UnLtd was formed in 2000 by seven non-profit organisations: Ashoka: Innovators for the Public, Changemakers, Community Action Network (CAN), Comic Relief, The Scarman Trust, SENSCOT, and The School for Social Entrepreneurs (SSE).

The awards are funded by the income generated by a £100 million endowment from the Millennium Commission as a permanent source of grants for individuals throughout the United Kingdom to develop their skills and talents, and to contribute to the community; the income from the endowment is held by the Millennium Awards, of which UnLtd is the sole Trustee. John Rafferty was the first Chief Executive who with Sandra Jetten COO successfully negotiated the grant of £100 million from the Millennium Commission and established the network of UK wide offices and staff. From 2006-2015 UnLtd was headed by Cliff Prior, who went on to become Chief Executive at Big Society Capital.

Programs 
Through its Awards program, UnLtd provides a combination of cash funding, support, networking opportunities and pro bono services to entrepreneurs. The awards range from  £2,500 to  £20,000

UnLtd Ventures provides consultancy support to a number of outstanding social entrepreneurs, helping them to scale up or replicate their projects, through in-house business consultants, partnerships with external consultants, and funding sources.

UnLtd Research studies the impact of the support UnLtd gives to early start social entrepreneurs, and the impact they have on the worlds in which they live.  UnLtd has partnerships with academic institutions UCL, Open University, Middlesex University, University of Birmingham.

The organization's funding throughout the UK is divided throughout 5 regions; London, The South and the East of England, The North of England and the Midlands, Scotland, Northern Ireland and Wales.

Global affiliates  
UnLtd supports a number of global partners, including:
 Unltd India, which funds and supports social entrepreneurs. Unltd India is based in Mumbai and also runs Bombay Connect. Other initiatives of UnLtd India are Bootcamp, Journeys for Change and Social Mashup.
 UnLtd South Africa, based in Cape Town, which funds and supports social entrepreneurs.
 UnLtd Thailand  which funds and supports social entrepreneurs. Unltd Thailand is based in Bangkok.
 UnLtd USA, which operates a twelve-month fellowship program for social entrepreneurs in Austin, Texas.

UnLtdWorld 
On March 4, 2008, UnLtd launched UnLtdWorld, an online community for socially minded people. It was sold to The Guardian in 2011.

See also
 Social entrepreneurship
 Social enterprise
 Social firm
 Social business enterprise
Maharashtra State Innovation Society

Notes and references

External links 
UnLtd
UnLtdWorld
Ashoka
Changemakers
Community Action Network (CAN)
Comic Relief 
The Scarman  Trust
SENSCOT
The School for Social Entrepreneurs (SSE)

Comic Relief
Foundations based in the United Kingdom
International organisations based in London
Organisations based in the London Borough of Islington
Social entrepreneurship